Recz  is a village in the administrative district of Gmina Rogowo, within Żnin County, Kuyavian-Pomeranian Voivodeship, in north-central Poland.

The village has an approximate population of 120.

References

Recz